Elof Holstenius (also spelled Elaus, Elavus, Olaus; 2 October 1677, in Västerås – 18 July 1736, in Husby) was a Swedish professor of theoretical philosophy and later, from 1709 to 1710, the rector of the Academia Gustavo-Carolina in Pärnu. He studied at Uppsala University. He would be the last rector of the Academia Gustavo-Carolina at large, with Georg Friedrich Parrot becoming the succeeding rector of the university, renamed the Kaiserliche Universität zu Dorpat, in 1802, nearly a century after the term of Holstenius.

References

1677 births
1736 deaths
People from Västerås
Swedish scholars and academics
Rectors of the University of Tartu
Academic staff of the University of Tartu
Uppsala University alumni